The tribute penny was the coin that was shown to Jesus when he made his famous speech "Render unto Caesar..." The phrase comes from the King James Version of the gospel account: Jesus is asked, "Is it lawful to give tribute to Caesar, or not?" (Mark ) and he replies, "bring me a penny, that I may see it".

Biblical Account
The Pharisee or "spy" asking Jesus whether to pay Roman taxes/tribute is attempting to entrap him into admitting his opposition to doing so.  So upon seeing that the coin is a "tribute penny", Jesus avoids the trap by saying to give it back to Caesar, because it is his anyway.

The Greek text uses the word dēnarion, and it is usually thought by scholars that coin was a Roman denarius with the head of Tiberius. It is this coin that is sold and collected as the "tribute penny", and the Gospel story is an important factor in making this coin attractive to collectors. The inscription reads "Ti[berivs] Caesar Divi Avg[vsti] F[ilivs] Avgvstvs" ("Caesar Augustus Tiberius, son of the Divine Augustus"), claiming that after death Augustus had become a god. The reverse shows a seated female, usually identified as Livia depicted as Pax.

However, it has been suggested by some scholars that denarii were not in common circulation in Judaea during Jesus' lifetime and that the coin was more probably an Antiochan tetradrachm bearing the head of Tiberius, with Augustus on the reverse. Another suggestion often made is the denarius of Augustus with Gaius and Lucius on the reverse, while coins of Julius Caesar, Mark Antony and Germanicus are all considered possibilities.

Gospel of Thomas
A similar episode occurs in the Gospel of Thomas (verse 100), but there the coin in question is gold.

See also
Coins in the Bible

References

External links
Render Unto Caesar, vodcast by Professor Kevin Butcher of the University of Warwick

Coins in the Bible
Christian terminology
Cultural depictions of Tiberius
Cultural depictions of Augustus